Noorpur may refer to one of the following places:

India 
 Noorpur, Uttar Pradesh, a city in Uttar Pradesh, India
 Noorpur (Assembly constituency) in Uttar Pradesh, India
 Noorpur Muzbida Harsana, a village in Bagpat district, Uttar Pradesh

Pakistan 
 Noorpur Thal, a city in Khushab District of Punjab 
 Noorpur Thal Tehsil, a tehsil in Khushab District of Punjab 
 Jamali Noorpur, a union council of Khushab District
 Noorpur railway station in Toba Tek Singh District of Punjab
 Noor Pur 122 JB, a town in Faisalabad District of Punjab 
 Noorpur, Chakwal, a town in Chakwal District of Punjab 
 Noorpur Stupas, an archaeological site in Gilgit, Gilgit-Baltistan

See also 
 Nurpur (disambiguation)